Vice Admiral Marakand Aravind Hampiholi, PVSM, AVSM, NM is a serving flag officer in the Indian Navy. He currently serves as the Flag Officer Commanding-in-Chief, Southern Naval Command. Previously, he served as the Commandant of Indian Naval Academy and served as the Director General Naval Operations (DGNO) at Naval headquarters.

Early life
Hampiholi was born in Dharwad in Karnataka. He attended the Sainik School, Bijapur. He graduated from the National Defence Academy in 1983 with the President's Gold Medal.

Naval career 
Hampiholi was commissioned into the Indian Navy in the Executive branch on 1 July 1985. He is a specialist in Anti-submarine warfare. He has completed the staff course at the Defence Services Staff College (DSSC) in Wellington Cantonment and the higher command course at the Naval War College, Goa. He has also attended the National Defence College, New Delhi.

In the early years of his career, he served as an ASW specialist aboard the Nilgiri-class frigate , the Abhay-class corvette  and the Godavari-class frigate .

Hampiholi has commanded the Veer-class missile vessel , the Magar-class amphibious warfare vessel  and the Talwar-class guided missile frigate . He has also served as the Second-in-command of the Khukri-class corvette . During his command of INS Talwar, he was conferred the Nausena Medal (Devotion to Duty).

He also commanded the National Coast Guard of Mauritius from 2003 to 2005. From June 2007 to June 2009, Hampiholi served as the Commandant of the Naval Academy and the Commanding Officer of Naval base INS Mandovi.

He has tenanted the instructional appointments of Instructor at the Anti Submarine Warfare School, Kochi and that of Senior Directing Staff at the Naval War College, Goa. Hampiholi, in his staff appointments, has served as the Joint Director of Personnel at Naval HQ, Naval Assistant to the Flag Officer Commanding-in-Chief Eastern Naval Command. He also served as the Principal Director Staff Requirements at Naval HQ.

Flag rank
On promotion to Flag Rank, Hampiholi took over as the Assistant Chief of Naval Staff (Human Resource Development). He then assumed the office of Flag Officer Sea Training (FOST) at Kochi. As FOST, his charter included the conduct of the operational sea training of all ships of the Indian Navy and the Indian Coast Guard.

On 22 January 2018, Hampiholi assumed the office of the Flag Officer Commanding Western Fleet. For his command of the Western Fleet, Hampiholi was awarded the Ati Vishisht Seva Medal on 26 January 2019. Hampiholi took over as the Director General Naval Operations on promotion to the rank of Vice Admiral on 27 March 2019. On 27 July 2020, he assumed office as the Commandant of Indian Naval Academy.

Awards and decorations
He was awarded PVSM on 26 January 2023.

Gallery

See also
 Flag Officer Commanding Western Fleet
 Western Fleet
 Commandant of Indian Naval Academy

References 

Indian Navy admirals
Flag Officers Commanding Western Fleet
Flag Officers Sea Training
Recipients of the Ati Vishisht Seva Medal
National Defence Academy (India) alumni
Living people
Year of birth missing (living people)
Commandants of the Indian Naval Academy
National Defence College, India alumni
Recipients of the Nau Sena Medal
Naval War College, Goa alumni
Academic staff of Naval War College, Goa
Defence Services Staff College alumni